The Roman Catholic Diocese of Ario was a Latin Rite Catholic diocese in Greece.

History 
The bishopric was established in 1300.

It was suppressed on 5 October 1551, its title and territory being merged into the Roman Catholic Diocese of Retimo–Ario on Crete.

Bishops 
 Lazzaro (? – ?)
 Reprandino di Santa Lucia, Friars Minor O.F.M. (1349.07.08 – 1352.05.25), later Bishop of La Canea (Cydonioa, Greece) (1352.05.25 – ?)
 Andrea (1352.05.25 – ?)
 Gerardo di Bologna, Augustinians O.E.S.A. (1357.03.01 – ?)
 Francesco di Vilano, O.F.M. (1372.03.09 – ?)
 Antonio Contareno (1384 – 1386.04.06), later Metropolitan Archbishop of Crete (Greece) (1386.04.06 – 1387.03.16)
 Francesco, Carmelites O. Carm. (1388? – 1409?)
 Rolando (1409? – ?)
 Franchione Secreti, O.F.M. (1410.07.28 – 1414.04.02), later Bishop of Milopotamus (1414.04.02 – death 1437)
 Bertramino di Serafini, O.F.M. (1414.07.30 – ?)
 Antonio Guido, Dominican Order (O.P.) (1418.12.14 – 1421)
 Jean de Chorono, O.P. (1421.04.21 – 1432)
 Giovanni Vanni, O.F.M. (1432 – death 1433)
 Nicola Salma di Candia, O.F.M. (1433.11.16 – death 1434)
 Benedetto Paconati, O.P. (1434.09.22 – 1438.01.10), later Bishop of Bagnoregio (Italy, 1438.01.10 – 1445)
 Antonio Mina di Candia, O.F.M. (1438.11.03 – ?)
 Philippe Bartolomei (1469.04.23 – 1480.04.14), later Bishop of Hierapetra (1480.04.14 – ?)
 Giorgio (1480.04.14 – ?)
 Carlo Roselli (1484.10.14 – ?)
 Bartolomeo Siringi (seniore) (1520.06.01 - 1536.11.06 Appointed, Bishop of Castellaneta) 
 Marco Adantino, O.F.M. Obs. (1537.12.05 - 1538.02.20 Appointed, Bishop of Chiron) 
 Ludovico de Martinis, O.P. (1538.10.07 - 1541 Died) 
 Francisco Frías  (14.11.1544 - 1550 Resigned)
...

References 

Ario
Kingdom of Candia
Ario
1300 establishments in Europe
1551 disestablishments